Frieda Tiltsch (21 February 1922 – 11 July 1994) was an Austrian athlete. She competed in the women's discus throw at the 1948 Summer Olympics and the 1952 Summer Olympics.

References

1922 births
1994 deaths
Athletes (track and field) at the 1948 Summer Olympics
Athletes (track and field) at the 1952 Summer Olympics
Austrian female discus throwers
Olympic athletes of Austria
Place of birth missing